Athis amalthaea is a moth in the family Castniidae first described by Herbert Druce in 1890. It is found in Brazil.

References

Moths described in 1890
Castniidae